The following is a comprehensive list of American country music artist Brad Paisley's concert tours. Since 2005 he has headlined fifteen concerts tours, and co-headlined two.

Muds and Suds Tour (2005)

The Muds and Suds Tour was a co-headlining concert tour by Paisley and fellow American country music artist Sara Evans. It supported Paisley's third studio album Mud on the Tires (2003) and Evan's fourth studio album Restless (2003). The tour began on January 14, 2005, in Verona, New York and finished on March 6, 2005, in Rochester, Minnesota.

Opening acts
Andy Griggs

Tour dates

Two Hats and a Redhead Tour (2005)

The Two Hats and a Redhead Tour was a co-headlining concert tour by Paisley and American country music artist Reba McEntire with special guest Terri Clark. It began on April 15, 2005, in Virginia Beach, Virginia and ended on June 18, 2005, in San Bernardino, California.

Opening acts
Terri Clark 
Joe Nichols

Tour dates

Time Well Wasted Tour (2005–06)

The Time Well Wasted Tour was Paisley's first headlining concert tour. It supported his fourth studio album, Time Well Wasted (2005). It began on December 9, 2005, in Lowell, Massachusetts, and finished on December 8, 2006, in Rosemont, Illinois.

Opening acts

Leg 1
Terri Clark
Johnny Reid

Leg 2
Sara Evans
Billy Currington
Terri Clark 

Leg 3
Sara Evans
Josh Turner
Billy Currington
Randy Rogers Band

 
Leg 4
Carrie Underwood

Setlist
This setlist is a representation of the Columbia, Missouri, show.
 
"Celebrity"
"Wrapped Around"
"Me Neither"
"Mud on the Tires"
"Little Moments"
"I'll Take You Back"
"She's Back"
"Easy Money"
"When I Get Where I'm Going" 
"Whiskey Lullaby"
"The World"	
"Alcohol"
"I'm Gonna Miss Her (The Fishin' Song)"
"Folsom Prison Blues"

Tour dates

Bonfires & Amplifiers Tour (2007–08)

The Bonfires & Amplifiers Tour was Paisley's second headlining concert tour. The tour first supported his fourth album Time Well Wasted then later his fifth studio album, 5th Gear (2007). The tour was first announced in January 2007, and the 2008 leg in August 2007. It began on April 26, 2007, in Chattanooga, Tennessee and finished on February 23, 2008.

Opening acts

Jack Ingram
Kellie Pickler
Taylor Swift
Rodney Atkins 
Chuck Wicks

Setlist
This setlist is a representation of the Burgettstown, Pennsylvania show on September 15, 2007.
 	
"Online"
"Wrapped Around"
"Mud on the Tires"
"Me Neither"
"Better Than This"
"She's Everything"
"Celebrity"
"The World"
"Throttleneck"
"Mr. Policeman"
"When I Get Where I'm Going"
"Little Moments"
"We Danced"
"Take Me Home, Country Roads" 
"Whiskey Lullaby"
"Ticks"
"Alcohol"
Encore
"I'm Gonna Miss Her (The Fishin' Song)"
"Folsom Prison Blues"

Tour dates

Paisley Party Tour (2008–09)

The Paisley Party Tour was Paisley's third headlining concert tour. It began on June 11, 2008, in Albuquerque, New Mexico and finished on March 1, 200, in Yakima, Washington. It was in support of his albums 5th Gear and Play: The Guitar Album.

Opening acts

Leg 1
Jewel
Chuck Wicks
Julianne Hough

Leg 2
Darius Rucker (January)
Crystal Shawanda (February, March)

Tour dates

American Saturday Night Tour (2009–10)

The American Saturday Night Tour was Paisley's fourth headlining concert tour. It was in support of his album American Saturday Night. It began on June 5, 2009, in Charlotte, North Carolina and finished on March 6, 2010, in North Charleston, South Carolina.

Background
The second leg was announced in January 2010, and began on January 7, 2010, in San Antonio, Texas.

Opening acts

Leg 1
Dierks Bentley
Jimmy Wayne

Leg 2
Miranda Lambert
Justin Moore

Setlist

"Start a Band"
"American Saturday Night"
"Wrapped Around"
"Celebrity"
"Mud on the Tires"
"Waitin' on a Woman" 
"Water"
"I'm Still a Guy"
"Catch All the Fish"
"I'm Gonna Miss Her (The Fishin' Song)"
"She's Everything"
"The World"
"Huckleberry Jam/Cliffs of Rock City"
"Letter to Me"
"When I Get Where I'm Going"
"Online"
"Ticks"
"When I Get Where I'm Going"
"Then"
"Ticks"
"Welcome to the Future"
Encore
"Alcohol"
"The Boys of Summer"

Tour dates

The H2O Tour / H2O Frozen Oven Tour (2010–11)

The H2O Tour was Paisley's fifth headlining concert tour and was in support of American Saturday Night (2009). The tour began on May 21, 2010, in Virginia Beach, Virginia and finished on  February  26, 2011, in Nashville, Tennessee. The winter 2011 leg of the tour was rebranded as The H2O Frozen Over Tour.

Background
The tour was first announced in March 2010. At each tour stop there were donations made to the Hope Through Healing campaign. Also at every tour stop there was a "World Water Plaza". The plaza consisted of an additional performance stage, water themed activities, the Hope Through Healing booth, a fishing simulator, a Corvette simulator where fans could virtually race Paisley. Winners of the race had the chance to meet Paisley. The first leg was presented by Chevrolet. The 2011 leg of the tour was announced in October 2010.

Opening acts

2010 shows
Darius Rucker
Justin Moore 
Water World Plaza
Easton Corbin
Steel Magnolia
Josh Thompson

2011 shows
Darius Rucker
Jerrod Niemann

Setlist
This setlist is a representation of the Charlotte, NC show on August 27, 2010.

" Water"
"Online"
"American Saturday Night"
"Wrapped Around"
"You Do the Math"
"Celebrity"
"Waitin' on a Woman" 
"Catch All the Fish" 
"Letter to Me"
"Mud on the Tires"
"I'm Still a Guy"
"Time Warp"
"Whiskey Lullaby" 
"The World"
"I'm Gonna Miss Her (The Fishin' Song)"
"Welcome to the Future" 
"Then"
Encore
 "Ticks"
"Alcohol"

Tour dates

H2O II: Wetter and Wilder Tour (2011)
{{Infobox concert
| concert_tour_name = H2O II: Wetter and Wilder Tour
| image             = 
| image_size        = 220px
| landscape         = no
| alt               = 
| border            = yes
| image_caption     = 
| artist            = Brad Paisley
| album             = This Is Country Music
| location          = North America, Europe
| start_date        = 
| end_date          = 
| number_of_legs    = 3
| number_of_shows   = 33
| last_tour         = The H2O Tour/H20 Frozen Over Tour(2010–11)
| this_tour         = H2O II: Wetter and Wilder Tour(201)
| next_tour         = Virtual Reality Tour (2012)
}}The H2O Tour was Paisley's sixth headlining concert tour and was in support of his ninth studio album, This Is Country Music (2011). The tour began on May 28, 2011, in Pittsburgh, Pennsylvania and finished on September 25, 2011, in Raleigh, North Carolina.

Opening acts

Darius Rucker
Jerrod Niemann
Blake Shelton

Water World Plaza
Edens Edge
Sunny Sweeney
Brent Anderson

Tour dates

Virtual Reality World Tour (2012)
The Virtual Reality World Tour was Paisley's seventh headlining concert tour. It was in support of his eighth studio album, This Is Country Music (2011). The tour began on January 12, 2012, in Grand Rapids, Michigan and ended on November 13, 2012, in Dublin, Ireland. It ranked sixteen for Billboard's Top 25 Tours of 2012.

Beat This Summer Tour (2013)
The Beat This Summer Tour was Paisley's eighth headlining tour. It was in support of his ninth studio album, Wheelhouse and was presented by Cracker Barrel. The tour began on May 9, 2013, in Maryland Heights, Missouri and finished on March 16, 2014, in London, England. 

Country Nation World Tour (2014–15)
The Country Nation World Tour Paisley's ninth headlining concert tour and was in support of his ninth studio album, Wheelhouse (2013), and tenth studio album, Moonshine in the Trunk (2014). The tour began on May 16, 2014, in Camden, New Jersey, and finished on April 26, 2015, in Anchorage, Alaska.

Crushin' It World Tour (2015–16)
The Crushin' It World Tour was Paisley's tenth headlining concert tour and was in support of his tenth studio album Moonshine in the Trunk (2014). It began on May 15, 2015, in Camden, New Jersey and finished on March 12, 2016, in Bloomington, Illinois. The tour played through amphitheaters and festivals across the United States and Canada. 

Life Amplified World Tour (2016–17)
The Life Amplified World Tour was Paisley's eleventh headlining concert tour. It began on May 19, 2016, in Wheatland, California and concluded on February 18, 2017, in Verona, New York, The tour played through amphitheaters and festivals across United States and Canada.

Weekend Warrior Tour (2017–18)

The Weekend Warrior World Tour was the Paisley's fifteenth headlining concert tour by and was in support of his eleventh studio album Love and War (2017). It began on May 18, 2017, in Saratoga Springs, New York and finished on April 26, 2018, in Lincoln, Nebraska. The tour visited North America and Europe. "Weekend Warrior" derives from Paisley playing on weekends this tour. The tour was first announced in May 2017. The 2018 leg was announced in November 2017.

For this tour Paisley has teamed up with the Sarah Cannon the Cancer Institute of HCA to "Band Against Cancer". At every show concert there will be onsite resources where concert goers can "askSARAH" (the institute's hotline) questions. At the show fans can purchase Paisley's album Love and War for $15, and as part of "get one, give one", when they buy a copy, they can send a copy to a cancer patient for an additional $15.

Opening acts

Chase Bryant 
Lindsay Ell 
Dustin Lynch 

Set list
This setlist is a representation of the Charlotte, NC show.

"Last Time for Everything"
"Old Alabama"
"Perfect Storm"
"Online"
"One Beer Can"
"Crushin' It"
"This Is Country Music"
"Love and War"
"American Saturday Night"
"Ticks"
"I'm Still a Guy"
"Celebrity"
"Then"
"She's Everything"
"River Bank"
"Grey Goose Chase"
"Waitin' on a Woman" 
"When I Get Where I'm Going"
"Water"	
"Whiskey Lullaby"
"I'm Gonna Miss Her (The Fishin' Song)"
"Mud on the Tires"
"Today"
Encore
"Alcohol"

Tour dates

Tour 2021 (2021)

The Tour 2021 was Paisley's fourteenth headlining concert tour. It began on June 5, 2021, at the Pepsi Gulf Coast Jam in Panama City, Florida, and finished on October 9, in Irvine, California. Portion of ticket sales went to Paisley's nonprofit free-referral based grocery store he co-founded, The Store.

Opening acts
Jimmie Allen
Kameron Marlowe

Tour dates

Notes
The August 9 show was co-headlined with Lynyrd Skynyrd

World Tour 2022 (2022)

The World Tour 2022''' is Paisley's fifteenth headlining concert tour. It began on May 27, 2022, in Uncasville, Connecticut and finished on September 17, in McHenry, Illinois.

Opening acts
Tracy Lawrence
Scotty McCreery
Morgan Evans
Tenille Townes
Caylee Hammack

Tour dates

References

Concert tours
Paisley, Brad